Colegio de Santa Ana (CDSA) is a private Catholic (Parochial) institution located in Liwayway Street, Santa Ana, Taguig, Philippines. Founded in 1980 by Rt. Rev. Msgr. Augurio I. Juta, CDSA offers Christian Catholic education.

History

The institution was created with the vision to help in the Catholic formation and educational enhancement of parishioners and common folks alike for the native Taguigenos (Canon 804 §1 of the Code of Canon Law). It was in the early 1980s that this idea sprang from Rt. Rev. Msgr. Augurio Juta, a resident parish priest of St. Anne with the assistance of Rev. Mother María Josefina C. Yamson, RVM, then Superior Gen. of the Congregation of the Religious of the Virgin Mary.

1980–1985
In June 1980, preparatory courses for nursery and kindergarten were opened simultaneously, with Sister Ma. Josefina C. Campos, RVM, as the pioneer teacher, with the Department of Education, Culture, and Sports (DECS) permit to operate from Nursery to Grade One. To strengthen the foundation further and to meet the growing demand, the director sought the assistance and support from a mandated organization, the Manila Archdiocesan and Parochial Schools Association (MAPSA), in January 1982. 

This membership formalized the contract agreed upon by the Roman Catholic Archbishops of Manila, as represented by Jaime Cardinal Sin and the Sta. Ana Parochial School Administration as represented by Rev. Mother Ma. Josefina C. Yamson, RVM. To follow up on this formalization, Santa Ana Parochial School filed its Articles of Incorporation with the Securities and Exchange Commission (SEC) on July 8, 1982; created its policy-making body; and completed its by-laws by January 31, 1985. On March 19, 1985, Fr. Augurio l. Juta died, and the directorship was succeeded by Msgr. Emmanuel Sunga, H.P., who was installed on the 25th of the same month.

1986–1992
In 1986, Santa Ana Parochial School was given the government recognition on August 8 for the Nursery and Kinder and for the Complete Elementary Course on June 24. Msgr. Sunga pursued the creation of more rooms and established the dream of housing the high school department by way of creating "St. Anne Building", which formally opened and was blessed on May 15, 1988, by Bishop Manuel Sobreviñas.

By now, Taguig has already had a Catholic High School, albeit under a temporary permit from the DECS. After years of operation under a temporary permit, the recognition was granted to the high school department on December 10, 1991, with Sis. Ma. Auxencia P. Bitangjol, RVM, as the principal both for the high school and the elementary department.

Enrollment rate kept on increasing starting from 1987. At the beginning, there were 870 students enrolled which then increased to over a thousand by 1990. The construction of the rooms fronting the church plaza, the gymnasium and the church compound and the approval of St. Anne Parish as the Archdiocesan Shrine of St. Anne in August 1989 were some of the highlights of Msgr. Sunga's directorship.

On April 2, 1990, Msgr. Isidro José took over as director with his formal installation on May 6 of the same year. In 1990, approximately 1,365 students were enrolled in Santa Ana Parochial School.

1993–1997
Rev. Fr. Lucio B. Odiver was appointed the Sta. Ana Parochial School director on January 3, 1993. After over a month, he immediately ordered the construction of the three-storey classroom for the Kinder level which was blessed on June 6, 1993, by Rev. Fr. Odiver himself. To continue the feat of the institution, also with the guidance of the newly appointed Principal in 1992, Sister Ma. Nelly A. Aninon, 104 or 100% of the Santa Ana Parochial School elementary students who took the first National Elementary Assessment Test (NEAT) passed and all the Secondary Graduating students also passed the National College Entrance Examination (NCEE).

Sister Ma. Jacinta J. Chavez, RVM, became the principal of Sta. Ana Parochial School (SAPS) starting school year 1995–1996 with the enrollment steadily increasing, even reaching 1,628.
The administration was modified in school year 1997–1998 with the delegation of two principals – one for each department. The high school department was headed by Sr. Ma. Teresita C. Camartin, RVM while Sr. Ma. Lunda F. Fesalbon, RVM was assigned to be the Principal for the Elementary department.
Jaime Cardinal Sin visited the institution once again for the blessing of the newly constructed offices and facilities which included the Principal's Office, the Faculty room, the Medical/Dental clinic, the two (2) comfort rooms both for the faculty and the students, and the boys' quarters on July 14, 1997, in dedication to its late founder, Msgr. Augurio Juta. 

The unveiling and dedication ceremony was done on March 5, 1998, coinciding with the 13th anniversary of the death of its founder.
Sr. Ma. Elisa N. Forbes, RVM and Sr. Ma. Milagros S. Sealonggo, RVM, Principals for the high school and elementary respectively, gave way to the organization of the Student Coordinating Council (High School) and the Kiddie Government (Elementary).

1998–2003
The school year of 1998–1999, also called the 'CENTENNIAL YEAR', bore a new administration led by lay administrators in the person of Mrs. Amparo R. Delute as High School Principal and Mrs. Milagros R. Fugen, Elementary Principal.

School year 1999–2000 or the JUBILEE YEAR or THE YEAR OF GOD, THE FATHER was the year that the name Santa Ana Parochial School was changed to Colegio de Santa Ana. This year also commenced the creation of the new building adjacent to the St. Anne building, and the realization of the Audiovisual Room in the 4th floor.

The full creation of the 4th floor for the incoming 4th year students marked some of the achievements of Msgr. Lucio B. Odiver before he resigned in 2002. Rev. Fr. Roy M. Rosales lit the torch as director officially on March 15, 2002. With Rev. Father Rosales, the offices of Colegio de Santa Ana were all made to be airconditioned and most offices were converted to more suitable stations for work. The finishing of the Audiovisual Room, the improvement of the laboratories and most facilities materialized this year.

In 2003, a new set of school uniform for boys and girls was implemented to establish the image of the CDSA students and its banner color, gold.

2004–2006
The Silver Jubilee Celebration sparked the school year 2004–2005 with the gathering of the significant figures in the foundation of the now household name, Colegio de Sta. Ana.

After Rev. Fr. Roy swerved in a new direction, Fr. Paul Balagtas succeeded the directorship after a short stay as director by Fr. Amando Litana. Fr. Paul was officially installed as the new director in October 2005.

2007–2019
Another improvement is the newly constructed High School Computer Laboratory, made possible through the support of the parents and students of CDSA during the Mr. and Ms. CDSA campaign. Total cost of this laboratory is more than Php 1.5 million. The old Computer Laboratory in the Marian Building, exclusively for the Elementary pupils, will undergo renovations too. A total of 53 computer units are purchased for the new laboratory. The canteen extension is converted into a Mini-Conference Room. The entire room is renovated and air-condition is installed for a more comfortable place for a small gathering.

Rev. Fr. Orlando B. Cantillon took a short stay as the school's director until finally on September 1, 2010, Rev. Fr. Amando N. Litana was officially installed as the new director of the school.

2019–2020
A new 5-storey building is being constructed for the Senior High School department and a new home for the Clinic, Guidance Office and Library. The new building is expected to be finished in time for the opening of SY 2020–2021.

Course offerings
Colegio de Santa Ana offers the K-12 Curriculum, as per DepEd implementation.

Preschool: 
 Nursery
 Kinder

Elementary:
Grades 1 to 6

Junior High School:
Grades 7 to 10

Senior High School
Grades 11 to 12

Summer Enrichment Programs: Taekwondo, Basketball, Volleyball, Ballet, Reading

Current administrators
Director: Rev. Fr. Edgardo B. Barrameda
Principal: Mrs. Lennie A. Montevirgen
Assistant Principal: Mrs. Criselda P. Cruz
Finance Officer: Mrs. Mary Ann S. Okol
CCF Head: Sr. Leonila B. Guerra, fma

References

External links

 Colegio de Santa Ana Blog 
 The Ananian Gazette
 CDSA Facebook Page
CDSA Website

Catholic elementary schools in Metro Manila
Catholic secondary schools in Metro Manila
Schools in Taguig